Dennlys Parc is a theme park in Dennebrœucq, Pas-de-Calais. The park's mascot is Denno the tortoise.

History
In 1983, a family from a carnival background, Monsieur and Mme Gérard Crunelle, found by chance that the Old Watermill was for sale. 
After years of work, conceptualizing and creating the settings, the Old Watermill became Dennlys Park.  Christian Crunelle, son of Gérard and manager since 1997, strives to preserve the family festival atmosphere.

Gallery

The Attractions

Rollercoasters

Other attractions
Cannibal Pots - Rotary Ride (2006)
Chateau hanté - Hauted House and scenic views
Monorail Denno - Monorail
La place des Geyser - Water Sports Area (2007)
Rio Grande - Train
Rokin'Tug - Rockin' Tug - Zamperla (2005)

External links
Official Website

Amusement parks in France
Tourist attractions in Hauts-de-France
Buildings and structures in Pas-de-Calais
Tourist attractions in Pas-de-Calais
1983 establishments in France
Amusement parks opened in 1983